Leucaloa is a genus of tiger moths in the family Erebidae. The moths in the genus are found in the Afrotropics.

Species
 Leucaloa butti (Rothschild, 1910)
 Leucaloa eugraphica (Walker, [1865] 1864)
 Leucaloa infragyrea  (Saalmüller, 1891)
 Leucaloa nyasica (Hampson, 1911)

References
 , 2009: Reviewing the African tiger-moth genera: 1. A new genus, two new subgenera and a species list from the expedition to Malawi by V.Kovtunovich & P. Usthjuzhanin in 2008-2009, with further taxonomic notes on South African Arctiinae (Lepidoptera, Arctiidae: Arctiinae). Atalanta 40 (1/2): 285-301, 352-355 (colour plates 24-27).
 , 2011: Arctiinae from African expeditions of V. Kovtunovich & P. Ustjuzhanin in 2009-2011, with description of new taxa and taxonomic notes (Lepidoptera, Arctiidae). Atalanta 42 (1/2): 125-135.
Natural History Museum Lepidoptera generic names catalog

Spilosomina
Moth genera